Schwamendingen Mitte (Schwamendingen centre) is a quarter in the district 12 in Zürich, located in the Glatt Valley (German: Glattal).

Schwamendingen and Oerlikon became independent municipalities in 1872. These were incorporated into the city of Zürich in 1934, together with Seebach, Affoltern, Witikon, Höngg, Altstetten and Albisrieden. After 1934 Schwamendingen was divided into the quarters Schwamendingen Mitte, Saatlen and Hirzenbach.

References 

District 12 of Zürich
Former municipalities of the canton of Zürich